Vikebukt is a village in Vestnes Municipality in Møre og Romsdal county, Norway. Along the eastern side of the mouth of the Tresfjorden, it is located just south of where the fjord meets the Romsdalsfjorden. Passing through the village is the European route E136 highway.    

Since 2014, Vikebukt has not been considered to be an urban settlement by Statistics Norway, therefore separate population statistics have not been tracked since that time. In 2015, the Tresfjord Bridge opened, crossing the fjord from Vestnes village to Vikebukt.  The bridge carries the European route E136 highway over the fjord and through Vikebukt.  

Vike Church is in Vikebukt.

References

Villages in Møre og Romsdal
Vestnes